Noah Ben Azure (born December 5, 1960) is a Ghanaian politician and member of the Sixth Parliament of the Fourth Republic of Ghana representing the Binduri Constituency in the Upper East Region on the ticket of the National Democratic Congress.

Personal life 
Azure is a Christian (Assemblies of God Church). He is married (with three children).

Early life and education 
Azure was born on December 5, 1960. He hails from Binduri, a town in the Upper East Region of Ghana. He entered University of Education, Winneba, Mampong Campus and obtained his bachelor's degree in education in 2000.

Politics 
Azure is a member of the National Democratic Congress (NDC). In 2012, he contested for the Binduri  seat on the ticket of the NDC sixth parliament of the fourth republic and won.

References 

1960 births
Living people
National Democratic Congress (Ghana) politicians
Ghanaian MPs 2013–2017
Ghanaian MPs 2017–2021